Martin Gisinger (born 21 June 1955) is a retired football midfielder from Austria. During his club career, Gisinger played for FC Dornbirn 1913, FC St. Gallen and FC Vaduz.

External links
 
 

1955 births
Living people
Austrian footballers
Austria international footballers
Association football midfielders
FC St. Gallen players
FC Vaduz players
Austrian expatriate footballers
Austrian expatriate sportspeople in Liechtenstein
Expatriate footballers in Liechtenstein